The 1967-68 FIBA European Championship Women was the tenth edition of the competition. Daugava Riga defeated Sparta Prague in a rematch of the previous season's final to win its fifth trophy in a row. Italy's AS Vicenza, which would win five trophies in the 1980s, became the first team from Western Europe to reach the competition's semifinals.

This edition marked a reform in the competition's system, with the quarter-finals being replaced by a 6-teams Group stage. This was preceded by a Qualifying Round and a Round of 12. Twenty teams took part in this edition, with defending champions Daugava entering the competition in the group stage and AS Vicenza receiving a bye to the round of 12. Sweden took part in the competition for the first time, while Turkey withdrew.

Qualifying round

Round of 12

Group stage

Group A

Group B

Semifinals

Final

References

Champions Cup
European
European
EuroLeague Women seasons